Kalateh-ye Zaman (also Romanized as Kalāteh-ye Zamān and Kalatehzaman) is a village in Dughayi Rural District, in the Central District of Quchan County, Razavi Khorasan Province, Iran. At the 2006 census, its population was 133, in 37 families.

References 

Populated places in Quchan County